Joe Lichaa (Arabic: جو ليشا) is an Australian former rugby league footballer who represented Lebanon in the 2000 Rugby League World Cup. 

In 2006 he played in two National Rugby League matches for the South Sydney Rabbitohs.

References

1980 births
Australian people of Lebanese descent
Australian rugby league players
Lebanon national rugby league team players
Living people
Place of birth missing (living people)
Rugby league locks
South Sydney Rabbitohs players